HNLMS Isaac Sweers (F814) is a frigate of the . The ship was in service with the Royal Netherlands Navy from 1968 to 1990. The ship's radio call sign was "PAVF". She was sold to the Indonesian Navy where the ship was renamed KRI Karel Satsuitubun (356).

Design and construction

In the early 1960s, the Royal Netherlands Navy had an urgent requirement to replace its s, obsolete ex-American escorts built during the Second World War. To meet this requirement, it chose to build a modified version of the British  as its , using broadly the same armament as the original design, but where possible, substituting Dutch electronics and radars.

Displacement was  standard and  full load.

A twin 4.5-inch (113 mm) Mark 6 gun mount was fitted forward. Anti-aircraft defence was provided by two quadruple Sea Cat surface-to-air missile launchers on the hangar roof. A Limbo anti-submarine mortar was fitted aft to provide a short-range anti-submarine capability, while a hangar and  helicopter deck allowed a single Westland Wasp helicopter to be operated, for longer range anti-submarine and anti-surface operations.

As built, Isaac Sweers was fitted with a Signaal LW-03 long range air search radar on the ship's mainmast, with a DA02 medium range air/surface surveillance radar carried on the ship's foremast. M44 and M45 fire control radars were provided for the Seacat missiles and ships guns respectively. The ship had a sonar suite of Type 170B attack sonar and Type 162 bottom search sonar. The ship had a crew of 251.

Modifications
All six Van Speijks were modernised in the 1970s, using many of the systems used by the new s. The 4.5-inch gun was replaced by a single OTO Melara 76 mm and launchers for up to eight Harpoon anti-ship missiles fitted (although only two were normally carried). The hangar and flight deck were enlarged, allowing a Westland Lynx helicopter to be carried, while the Limbo mortar was removed, with a pair of triple Mk 32 torpedo launchers providing close-in anti-submarine armament. A Signaal DA03 radar replaced the DA02 radar and an American EDO Corporation CWE-610 sonar replaced the original British sonar. Isaac Sweers was modernised at the Den Helder naval dockyard between 1 July 1980 and 28 October 1983. Isaac Sweers and Evertsen also received AN/SQR-18A towed array sonar system. The system was removed when the ships was sold to Indonesia.

Dutch service history
An order for four Van Speijks was placed in 1962, with two more, including Isaac Sweers, ordered in 1964. The ship was built at NDSM in Amsterdam. The keel laying took place on 5 May 1965 and the launching on 10 March 1967. The ship was put into service on 15 May 1968 with the pennant number F814.

In late 1972 she served as flagship for STANAVFORLANT.

In 1975 Isaac Sweers participated in the NATO exercise Ocean Safari.

The ship received a mid-life modernization in Den Helder, starting on 1 July 1980 and lasting till 28 October 1983. The completion of modernization was delayed by around eight months from intended due to lack of civilian labor in naval dockyards.

In 1986 she was present at the national Fleet days.

Isaac Sweers was decommissioned in 1990 and along with Evertsen were sold to Indonesia. She was transferred to the Indonesian Navy on 1 November 1990.

Indonesian service history
On 13 May 1989, Indonesia and the Netherlands signed an agreement for transfer of the last two Van Speijk-class ships. The ship was transferred to Indonesia on 1 November 1990 and renamed as KRI Karel Satsuitubun, assigned with pennant number 356.

By 2002, the ships Seacat missiles were inoperable and it was reported that propulsion problems were badly effecting the availability of the ships of this class. The ship's Seacat launchers were therefore replaced by two Simbad twin launchers for Mistral anti-aircraft missiles, and Karel Satsuitubun was re-engined with two  Caterpillar 3612 diesel engines. As the Indonesian Navy retired Harpoon missile from its stockpiles, Karel Satsuitubun was rearmed with Chinese C-802 missiles.

In December 2020, Indonesian Navy and Russian Navy conducted a joint naval exercise of Passex (Passing Exercise) Rusindo-20. The exercise took place in the Java Sea on Thursday, 17 December 2020. Indonesian Navy sent 3 ships (KRI Karel Satsuitubun, KRI Diponegoro, and KRI Tombak), while the Russian Navy sent 3 ships (Varyag, Admiral Panteleyev, and Pechenga). The exercise conducted several drills such as Maneuver Exercise, RAS approach, Flaghoist, Flashex, and Passing Exercise.

Notes

References

 

 

Van Speijk-class frigates
1967 ships
Ships built in Amsterdam